Eichhoffen station (French: Gare d'Eichhoffen) is a railway station serving the commune of Eichhoffen, Bas-Rhin department, France. The station is owned and operated by SNCF, in the TER Grand Est regional rail network and is served by TER trains.

It is located at kilometric point (KP) 14,892 on the Sélestat-Saverne railway between the stations of Epfig and Barr.

Services 
The station is frequented by TER Grand Est train services between Strasbourg and Sélestat via Molsheim.

References 

Railway stations in Bas-Rhin